Orot (lit. Lights) is a moshav in south Israel. Located near Kiryat Malakhi and covering an area of 2,000 dunams, it falls under the jurisdiction of Be'er Tuvia Regional Council.

History
The moshav was founded in 1952 by Jewish immigrants from the United States, Canada, and South Africa who were members of the Working Farmer movement. The name is derived  from Chapter 26, verse 19 of the Book of Isaiah: "Your dew is as the dew of the lights; the earth will give birth to her dead."

References

Moshavim
Populated places established in 1952
Populated places in Southern District (Israel)
1952 establishments in Israel
American-Jewish culture in Israel
Canadian-Jewish culture in Israel
South African-Jewish culture in Israel